Kiti or Keti, is a district in Daykundi province in central Afghanistan. It was created in 2005 from the former Kajran district. The main village Kiti is at 1,783 m altitude.

District profile 
 Villages: 180.
 Schools: 20 primary, 3 high schools, 1 religious.
 Health centers: 2 clinics, 1 maternity clinic.
 Main agricultural products: almond, fig, apricot.

References

External links 
 Summary of the District Development Plan, 2006

Districts of Daykundi Province
Hazarajat